1963 saw Independiente win the Argentine first division. Boca Juniors were runners up in the Copa Libertadores 1963.

The Argentina national team finished in 3rd place in the Copa América.

Primera División

Relegation
There was no relegation due to the expansion of the Primera División from 14 to 16 teams.

Copa Libertadores
Independiente qualified for Copa Libertadores 1964 via the league.

Copa Libertadores 1963
Boca Juniors: Runners-up

Argentina national team
Copa América
1963 South American Championship: 3rd place

References

Argentina 1963 by Osvaldo José Gorgazzi at rsssf.
Copa Libertadores 1963 by José Luis Pierrend, John Beuker and Osvaldo José Gorgazzi at rsssf.

            

pl:I liga argentyńska w piłce nożnej (1963)